Glenties is a town in County Donegal, Ireland. It is situated where two glens meet, north-west of the Bluestack Mountains, near the confluence of two rivers. Glenties is the largest centre of population in the parish of Iniskeel. Glenties has won the Irish Tidy Towns Competition five times in 1958, 1959, 1960, 1962 and 1995 and has won a medal many other times. , the population is 805.

History
Evidence of early settlement in the area is given by the many dolmens, standing stones and earthen ringforts dating from the Bronze Age. The area became part of the baronies of Boylagh and Bannagh in 1609, which was granted to Scottish undertakers as part of the Ulster Plantation.

Glenties was a regular stopping point on the road between the established towns of Ballybofey and Killybegs, and grew from this in the 17th and 18th centuries. The town was developed as a summer home for the Marquess Conyngham in the 1820s, because of its good hunting and fishing areas. The court house and market house were built in 1843. The Bank of Ireland building was completed in 1880.

Famine in Glenties
A workhouse was built during the Famine at the site of the current Comprehensive School in 1846, serving the greater Inniskeel area. A 40-bed Fever Hospital was later added to care for the sick and dying. The landlord, the Marquis of Conyngham, decided to halve the population of the town in 1847, faced with the rising costs of the workhouse. Only those who could show title to their land as rent payers were allowed to remain. The rest were given an option of going to America on a ship provided or entering the Workhouse in Glenties. Over 40,000 people died or emigrated from Co. Donegal between the years 1841 and 1851.

20th century

The railway was completed in 1895 from Ballybofey. In 1903 a local water scheme was established, to be replaced in 1925 by the current Lough Anna supply. In 1932 electricity was first generated locally in the town. Rural electrification came in the 1950s.

Glenties R.I.C. barracks was attacked on numerous occasions during the War of Independence in 1920/1921. On 29 June 1921, a group of Black and Tans were ambushed on their way to Ardara at Kilraine by the insurgents, resulting in the death of a Constable Devine.

Two Free State soldiers were killed at Lacklea in 1922 by IRA forces, during the Civil War.

In January 1944, a British RAF Sunderland Mark III flying boat crashed in the Croaghs area of the Bluestack Mountains, outside of Glenties, killing seven of its 12-man crew.

Brendan Behan spent more than two months with his wife on holiday in Glenties, starting in the third week of May 1960, and staying at the Highlands Hotel, where on Sunday 24 July (while hosting a seven-course dinner), the premises was raided by gardaí, with the case going to court that September and the hotelier charged with a breach of licensing laws (the raid came more than three hours after closing time). The son of Louis Joseph Walsh defended and Justice Bob O hUadaigh dismissed the case when it was explained that the event had been taking place in a private room where the resident Behan was doing "some of his literary work". Other events (documented by the Donegal Democrat) included "Mr and Mrs Behan, the noted playwright, from Dublin" being "guest artistes" at a meeting of the Ardara and Glenties branch of Comhaltas Ceoltóirí Éireann shortly after taking up residence in Glenties and on Wednesday 8 June Behan was at an ICA dance, picked the winning ticket in a raffle at the interval and sang songs bilingually.

Glenties was the first townland in County Donegal to provide cable television to the local area. In 1976 "Glenties Community Piped TV Co-op" was established which brought cable television to Glenties and the surrounding area, enabling viewers to enjoy multi-channel television from Northern Ireland via BBC One, BBC Two, Ulster Television and from 1982 Channel Four along with the national RTE channels.

In April 2006, IRA informer Denis Donaldson was shot dead by the Real IRA at a remote cottage near Derryloaghan, 8 km from Glenties.

Bord na Móna
Bord na Móna bought  of bog in 1937 to be drained and cut for peat. By 1943 a railway had been extended from Kilraine across the Owenea River to the bogs at Tullyard. Machine cutting commenced in 1946, utilising German-made cutting machines. The company employed 250 men in peak season and peak production was 22,000 tons in 1965. Operations ceased in the late 1990s and the railways and stock were lifted in 2006.

Politics
Glenties is a Municipal District, which returns six local residents to Donegal County Council. Nationally, Glenties is part of the five-seat Donegal Dáil constituency.

Around Glenties
Glenties is situated at the meeting of two glens, and two rivers; the Owenea and Stranaglough.

One of its most striking buildings is its unusual church, St Connell's, which was built in 1974 to replace the old church. The building has a flat roof sloping to the ground at a sharp angle. The original bell from the first church is still used today in the newer church.  St. Connell is the patron saint of the parish.  Liam McCormack won a European Award for its design in 1974.

Tourism

Patrick MacGill statue
A memorial to the 'Navvy Poet', Patrick MacGill, who was born in Glenties, is located on the bridge over the river in the centre of town.

St. Connell's Museum

St. Connell's Museum and Heritage Center has a good collection of local history artefacts, including some from the famine.  The museum is named after St. Connell Caol, who founded a monastic settlement on Inishkeel Island in the 6th century.  The museum also has a display about Cardinal Patrick O'Donnell, mementoes from the filming of Dancing at Lughnasa, and an extensive display about the County Donegal Railways Joint Committee.  It also has a reading room with a good collection of local historic records.

Sport
The local Gaelic games club – Naomh Conaill – fields teams at all age levels, playing football predominantly.

Glenties in popular culture
Glenties was the model for Brian Friel's fictional village of Ballybeg, where several of his works were set.  His play Dancing at Lughnasa was set in Ballybeg and was made into a film in 1994 starring Meryl Streep.

Transport

Glenties railway station was on a branch line of the County Donegal Railways Joint Committee, a narrow-gauge railway system. The Glenties branch was the first part of the County Donegal Railways to be closed; the railway station (and the branch line) opened on 3 June 1895 and finally closed on 15 December 1947.

Bus transport is currently provided by Bus Éireann, operated by McGeehan's Coaches, which provides services to Letterkenny, Ballybofey, Dungloe, Ardara, Killybegs and Donegal Town.

Tidy Towns
Glenties was the national winner of Ireland's Tidy Towns competition in 1958, 1959, 1960, 1962, and 1995.  Other recent results include being a Gold Medal winner in 2004, 2005, and 2006 and a silver medal winner in 2003.
Glenties received a Silver Medal in the European Entente Florale competition held in Győr, Hungary in 2005.

People
 Patrick O'Donnell (1856-1927) – Primate of All Ireland
 Thomas F. Breslin (1885-1942) – colonel, victim of the Bataan Death March
 Patrick MacGill (1889-1963) – the Navvy Poet
 Paddy O'Daire (1905-1981) - soldier and activist
 Father James McDyer (1910-1987) - Catholic priest and social campaigner
 Brian Friel (1929-2015) – playwright
 Tom Gildea (born 1939) – politician
 Enda Bonner (born 1949) – politician, football player
 Jim McGuinness (born 1972) – former manager of the senior Donegal county football team
 Máire O'Neill (born 1978) - engineer

See also
 List of populated places in Ireland

References

External links

 Glenties.ie
 County Donegal website's Glenties entry

 
Gaeltacht towns and villages
Towns and villages in County Donegal